Susman (Essence) is a 1987 Hindi film directed by Shyam Benegal. The film highlighted the struggle of rural handloom weavers in the wake of rapid industrialization.

The film was selected for the Indian Panorama at Filmotsav 1987, Invited to the London Film Festival, the Chicago Film Festival, the Vancouver International Film Festival, the Sydney & Melbourne Film Festivals 1987. It was remade as Kanchivaram in Tamil by Priyadarshan.

The film features poetry by the Indian mystic saint Kabir, who was born into a family of weavers, sung by Pandit Jasraj.

Cast
 Shabana Azmi -  Gauramma
 Om Puri - Ramulu
 Kulbhushan Kharbanda - Narasimha
 Neena Gupta -Mandira
 Mohan Agashe - President of Handloom Cooperative Society
 K.K. Raina
 Annu Kapoor -  Lakshmaya
 Ila Arun
 Anita Kanwar
 Pankaj Kapur
 Jayant Kripalani
 Satish Kaushik

References

External links
 

1978 films
1980s Hindi-language films
Films with screenplays by Shama Zaidi
Films directed by Shyam Benegal